Artistic swimming competitions at the 2021 Junior Pan American Games in Lima, Peru were held from 2 to 4 December 2021.

Medal summary

Medal table

Medalists

Qualification
A total of 80 artistic swimmers will qualify to compete at the games. As host nation, Colombia qualifies the maximum team size of nine athletes (eight women + 1 man). Seven other teams will qualify (each with nine athletes). Each team will also be required to compete in the duet event with athletes already qualified for the team event. A further four countries will qualify a duet only.

Canada and the United States, as being the only members located in zone 4 and zone 3 respectively, automatically qualify a full team. The South American region and the Central American and Caribbean region will qualify three teams and five duets each. Therefore, a total of eight teams and twelve duets, 8 mixed duets and 8 highlight teams will qualify.

See also
Artistic swimming at the 2020 Summer Olympics
2021 Junior Pan American Games

References

External links
PanAm Sports

Artistic swimming
Junior Pan American Games